Raipur Institute of Technology is a Private Engineering college located in Raipur, Chhattisgarh, India. It was established by the Mahanadi Education Society in 1995. It is affiliated to Chhattisgarh Swami Vivekanand Technical University.

History
Established in 1995, initially it was affiliated to Pt. Ravishankar Shukla University, Raipur and started offering Bachelor of Engineering in Chemical Engineering, Electronics & Telecommunication Engineering and Mechanical Engineering. Courses in Computer Science & Engineering (1999)
, Information Technology (2000) and Biotechnology (2004) were introduced. In 2005, institute became affiliated to newly formed Chhattisgarh Swami Vivekanand Technical University, Bhilai. Later introduced courses in Biotechnology and Electrical and Electronics Engineering in 2009 and 2011 respectively.

Academics 
RIT offers undergraduate and postgraduate course in Engineering along with Master of Business Administration and Master of Computer Application.

Departments
RIT has following departments:
Biotechnology
Chemical Engineering
Electronics & Telecommunication Engineering
Computer Science & Engineering
Civil Engineering
Information Technology
Mechanical Engineering
Electrical & Electronics Engineering
Master of Business Administration
Master of Computer Application

References

Private engineering colleges in India
1995 establishments in Madhya Pradesh
Educational institutions established in 1995
Engineering colleges in Chhattisgarh